Hushyar Chelleh (also Romanized as Hūshyār Cheleh and Hūshyār Chelleh; also known as Cheleh-ye ‘Alīshāh and Cheshmeh-Ye-Alīshāh) is a village in Cheleh Rural District, in the Central District of Gilan-e Gharb County, Kermanshah Province, Iran. At the 2006 census, its population was 447, in 92 families.

References 

Populated places in Gilan-e Gharb County